Gilbert Scott commonly refers to Sir George Gilbert Scott (1811–1878), a British architect principally known for his church buildings.

Gilbert Scott may also refer to several other British architects:
 George Gilbert Scott, Jr. (1839–1897), son of George Gilbert Scott
 Giles Gilbert Scott (1880–1960), son of George Gilbert Scott, Jr.
 Richard Gilbert Scott (1923–2017), son of Giles Gilbert Scott
 Adrian Gilbert Scott (1882–1963), son of George Gilbert Scott, Jr.